CUP (or cup) may refer to:

Economics 

 China UnionPay, a payment authorization system common in China
 Comparable uncontrolled price, a method used in transfer pricing
 Cuban peso, by ISO 4217 currency code

Education 

 California University of Pennsylvania
 Cambridge University Press
 Canadian University Press, the press association of Canadian student newspapers
 Center for Urban Pedagogy, New York City
 China University of Petroleum
 Clarion University of Pennsylvania
 Columbia University Press
 Cupertino Middle School, a public middle school in Sunnyvale, California

Politics 
 Candidatures d'Unitat Popular (Popular Unity Candidacy), a left-wing pro-independence Catalan political party
 Committee of Union and Progress, an Ottoman political movement and later party
 Conservative and Unionist Party, a British political party (rare)

Other 

 Cancer of unknown primary origin
 Central Utah Project
 Copper units of pressure, a measurement in internal ballistics
Collectif Ultras Paris, a supporters group of Paris Saint-Germain F.C.
Concluding Unscientific Postscript, a philosophical work by Søren Kierkegaard
 Cupar railway station station code
 Cursor Position (ANSI), an ANSI X3.64 escape sequence

See also
 Cup (disambiguation) or Cups
 CUPS, was the Common Unix Printing System, now officially CUPS